Mabelle Arole, born 26 December 1935 in Jabalpur, Madhya Pradesh, India is a recipient of the Ramon Magsaysay Award for Community Leadership along with her husband, Raj Arole for the  award-winning Comprehensive Rural Health Project.

Early life
She was the second of three children of Rajappan D. Immanuel, a professor of New Testament Greek at the Theological Seminary in that city and Beatrice Gunaratnampillai. Her parents were first cousins and came from an important family in Tamil Nadu. They were third generation Methodist Christians. Mabelle Arole then married Rajinikant Arole.

Work
Rajanikant Arole was born in Rahuri, Ahmednagar on 10 March 1935. Mabelle Arole was born Mabelle Immanuel in Jabalpur on 25 December 1935, daughter of a professor of Theology and Greek who taught at Duke University and in India. They met at Christian Medical College in Vellore, from where they graduated in 1959, at the top of their class. Married on 26 April 1960, they vowed to devote their new life to caring for the marginalized in rural areas. In 1962–66, they worked in a Mission Hospital in Vadala, 320 kilometers east of Mumbai. After this, the couple spent four years in the United States on a Fulbright Scholarship to obtain their residency training in Medicine and Surgery, as well as a Masters in Public Health, at Johns Hopkins University. Under the tutelage of Carl Taylor, a leader in the field of community health, the Aroles conceptualized the idea of CRHP to provide community-based primary health care and development to poor and marginalized communities in rural India.

Founding of CRHP 
Returning to India after their studies in the US, the Aroles decided to work in Jamkhed, a poor and drought-prone Taluka strife with inequalities. The village leaders of Jamkhed invited the Aroles to visit and talk to the community about their project. After a successful visit, the Aroles decided to stay and founded CRHP in August 1970. The initial coverage of CRHP was limited to 8 villages, with a total population of 10,000 villagers.

Expansion and outcomes 
In the first 25 years, the project expanded to a region of over 250,000 people. At its peak, CRHP worked with 178 villages. Outcomes were dramatic: infant mortality dropped from over 176 per 1,000 births to 23 per 1,000. Other health data also indicated substantial improvements in health in the project villages: 100% coverage of antenatal care for pregnant women and under 1% child malnutrition.

Over 40 years, CRHP has worked with 300 villages and over 500,000 people. The indirect impact of the organization is estimated to be at over 1 million people.

Death
Mabelle Arole died in 1999. She and Rajanikant are survived by their children Ravi and Shobha.

Publications 
In 1989, the Aroles received a grant for two years to write a book about their experiences. Jamkhed, published in 1994, chronicles the work of CRHP from its inception. It has become a classic read for students and practitioners in the field of public health.

References

External links
http://www.jamkhed.org/
http://jamkhed.org/Readings/HealthAllSocMed.pdf
https://web.archive.org/web/20081130231053/http://www.prb.org/Articles/2007/LessonsLearnedCommunity-BasedProject.aspx

http://www.aarogya.com/index2.php?option=com_content&task=view&id=3112&pop=1&page=0
http://ngm.nationalgeographic.com/2008/12/community-doctors/rosenberg-text/

Indian health activists
1935 births
1999 deaths
Ramon Magsaysay Award winners
People from Jabalpur
Activists from Madhya Pradesh